Nowa Jasienica  (formerly German Neu Jasenitz) - is a settlement in the administrative district of Gmina Police, within Police County, West Pomeranian Voivodeship, in north-western Poland, close to the German border.

History 

For the history of the region, see History of Pomerania.

Nowa Jasienica, known as Neu Jasenitz to its residents while part of Germany, became part of Poland after the end of World War II and changed its name to the Polish Nowa Jasienica.  

Below is a timeline showing the history of the different administrations that this city has been included in.

Political-administrative membership
  1815 - 1866: German Confederation, Kingdom of Prussia, Pomerania
 1866 - 1871: North German Confederation, Kingdom of Prussia, Pomerania
  1871 - 1918: German Empire, Kingdom of Prussia, Pomerania
  1919 - 1933: Weimarer Republik, Free State of Prussia, Pomerania
  1933 - 1945: Nazi Germany, Pomerania
  1945 - 1946: Enclave Police, (the area reporting to the Red Army)
  1946 - 1952: People's Republic of Poland, Szczecin Voivodeship
  1952 - 1975: People's Republic of Poland, Szczecin Voivodeship
  1975 - 1989: People's Republic of Poland, Szczecin Voivodeship
  1989 - 1998: Poland, Szczecin Voivodeship
  1999 - Current: Poland, Western Pomerania, powiat Police County, gmina Police

Demography
 The village has a population:
 1786 – 38
 1939 – 40
 1972 – 30

Tourism 
 PTTK path (black footpath  Szlak Parków i Pomników Przyrody) in an area of Nowa Jasienica in Wkrzanska Forest.

See also 

 Police
 Szczecin

References

Nowa Jasienica